Elections to the European Parliament were held in Belgium on 13 June 2004. The elections produced little overall change in the distribution of seats in the European Parliament among Belgium's many political parties. The two socialist parties improved their vote, while the Green parties lost ground. The Flemish nationalist party the Flemish Bloc (Vlaams Blok) registered the largest gains.

Candidates

Results

External links
 European Parliament Elections 2004 in Belgium
 European Elections results shown on Belgian cartogram

Belgium
European Parliament elections in Belgium
2004 elections in Belgium